San Francisco Bay in California has been served by ferries of all types for over 150 years. John Reed established a sailboat ferry service in 1826.  Although the construction of the Golden Gate Bridge and the San Francisco–Oakland Bay Bridge led to the decline in the importance of most ferries, some are still in use today for both commuters and tourists.

The Creek Route ferries (1851-1937)

One of the earliest ferry routes ran between San Francisco and Oakland on what was called the "creek route". The name derived from the Oakland landing site located at the foot of Broadway where Jack London Square is today, fronting on what is today called the Oakland Estuary, an inlet of San Francisco Bay. The estuary, which in the 1800s included what is today's Lake Merritt, was the "creek". In 1851, Captain Thomas Gray, grandfather of the famous dancer Isadora Duncan, began the first regular ferry service to San Francisco from the East Bay.
  Service started with the stern-wheel Sacramento River packet General Sutter and the small iron steam ferry Kangaroo.  Service was augmented in 1852 by Caleb Cope, the small ferry Hector powered by a steam sawmill engine, and the river packets Jenny Lind and Boston.  Boston burned that year and was replaced first by William Brown's San Joaquin River packet Erastus Corning and then by Charles Minturn's river packet Red Jacket.  In 1853, Minturn formed the Contra Costa Steam Navigation Company and had the ferry Clinton built expressly for trans-bay service.  A second ferry, Contra Costa began operating over the route in 1857.  Contra Costa Steam Navigation Company acquired San Antonio Steam Navigation Company with ferries San Antonio and Oakland by merger before being purchased by the San Francisco and Oakland Railroad (SF&O) in 1865. Ferries continued operating along the Creek Route under railroad ownership until 1937.

Railroad ferries (1862–1958)

The first railroad ferries on San Francisco Bay were established by the San Francisco and Oakland Railroad and the San Francisco and Alameda Railroad (SF&A), which were taken over by the Central Pacific Railroad (CPRR) in 1870 to become an integral part of the First transcontinental railroad. The earliest railroad ferries ran from Oakland Point and from Alameda Terminal when Alameda was still a peninsula. The ferry pier at Oakland Point was greatly enlarged to form the Oakland Long Wharf. These railroad ferries mostly carried passengers, not trains, although there was some ferrying of freight cars to San Francisco. When the Central Pacific re-routed the Sacramento to Oakland segment of the Transcontinental Railroad in 1876, a ferry across the Carquinez Strait was established, and the world's largest ferryboat, the Solano was built (later joined by a sister ferry, the slightly larger Contra Costa), to serve the crossing. This railroad ferry actually carried whole trains up to 48 freight cars or 24 passenger cars with their locomotives. These ferries became part of the Southern Pacific Railroad (SP) when it assumed many of the facilities of its affiliate, the Central Pacific. These large train ferries were idled when a railway bridge was completed over the Carquinez Strait in November, 1930.

When trains reached Oakland, freight cars were loaded aboard ferries from Long Wharf on Oakland Point beginning in 1870. Freight car ferry loading switched to the Oakland Mole in 1881. After 1890 freight cars were delivered to the San Francisco Belt Railroad ferry slip at the foot of Lombard and East Streets. Belt Railroad tracks were later dual-gauged to also carry cars from the narrow gauge North and South Pacific Coast Railroads.

The Key System transit company established its own ferry service in 1903 between the Ferry Building in San Francisco and its own pier and wharf ("mole") on the Oakland shoreline, located just south of what is today the eastern approach to the San Francisco–Oakland Bay Bridge.

Ferries began serving north bay rail connections with the Petaluma and Haystack Railroad in 1864.  San Francisco and North Pacific Railroad (SF&NP) and Petaluma and Santa Rosa Railroad (P&SR)  ferries connected Petaluma River landing locations with San Francisco.  North Pacific Coast Railroad (NPC) ferries connected Sausalito with San Francisco, and SF&NP ferries later sailed from Tiburon. Some of these ferries operated on Northwestern Pacific Railroad (NWP) schedules from 1907 to 1938.

The Napa Valley Railroad established service in 1865 and connected with ferry boat service in Vallejo, California. Monticello Steamship Company began operating ferries between Vallejo and San Francisco in 1895, and began coordinating with train schedules in 1905. Golden Gate Ferry Company gained control of Monticello in 1927 and, after merging with Southern Pacific, discontinued ferry service to Vallejo in 1937.

Sacramento Northern Railway used a ferry to cross the Sacramento and San Joaquin Rivers between Mallard and Chipps. Service began in 1912 with the wooden ferry Bridgit carrying six interurban cars. Bridgit burned in 1913 and was replaced by the steel ferry Ramon with the same car capacity.

Santa Fe and Western Pacific (WP) both ran passenger ferries connecting their east bay terminals to San Francisco; but both discontinued ferry service in 1933. Southern Pacific maintained a dominant position in Bay ferry service by gaining control of the South Pacific Coast Railroad (SPC) ferries in 1887, the Northwestern Pacific ferries in 1929, and the Petaluma and Santa Rosa ferries in 1932. After the San Francisco–Oakland Bay Bridge and Golden Gate Bridge opened in 1936 and 1937, Southern Pacific passenger ferry service was reduced to four routes: Ferry Building to Oakland Pier, Ferry Building to Alameda Pier, Hyde Street to Sausalito, and the Northwestern Pacific Ferry Building to Sausalito service. The route from Hyde Street to Sausalito was suspended in 1938 by order of the State Railroad Commission, the last ferry to Alameda ran in 1939, and the Ferry Building to Sausalito service ended February 1941. Many of the large passenger ferries were idled until World War II, when they were mobilized by the federal government to transport military personnel around the bay and shipyard workers from San Francisco to Marinship and Richmond Shipyards. The last Southern Pacific ferry ran between Oakland and San Francisco on 29 July 1958.

Auto ferries (1909–1956) 

Although earlier ferries had carried teams and wagons, Melrose was launched in 1909 as the first San Francisco Bay ferry built with an unobstructed lower deck specifically intended for automobiles, and an upper deck for passengers.  Southern Pacific ferries Melrose and Thoroughfare were designated to carry automobiles to and from San Francisco on the original Creek Route in 1911. Southern Pacific built new facilities to shift auto routing to the Oakland Pier in 1921 and purchased three new Six Minute ferries. In 1922, Golden Gate Ferry Company (GG) began transporting automobiles between Hyde Street Pier in San Francisco and Sausalito Ferry Terminal in Marin County.  Southern Pacific purchased three more auto ferries with a ferry route linking San Francisco with a Richmond, California connection to the Lincoln Highway in 1925. Golden Gate established another route between Hyde Street and Berkeley Pier in 1927. Southern Pacific built six diesel-electric ferries and gained control of Golden Gate's Golden-prefix ferries to form the subsidiary Southern Pacific-Golden Gate Company in 1929. Another auto ferry pier operated at the foot of Broadway. Southern Pacific-Golden Gate auto ferries ceased operation shortly after the San Francisco–Oakland Bay Bridge and Golden Gate Bridge opened. Most of the ferries were sold for use in Puget Sound, but a few were purchased by the Richmond-San Rafael Ferry Company to shuttle automobiles between Richmond and San Rafael. This last surviving auto ferry route ended when the Richmond–San Rafael Bridge opened in 1956.

Cross-Bay air service (1914–1986)
In 1914, a short-lived seaplane ferry ran between San Francisco and Oakland. From 1930 to 1933, a more successful trans-Bay seaplane ferry was operated by Air Ferries Ltd. It ran from Pier 5 on the San Francisco waterfront to a shoreline barge docked at the foot of Franklin Street along the Oakland Estuary. It also operated between San Francisco and Vallejo. A fatal accident in 1933 put an end to the service.

During the 1960s, SFO Helicopter transported passengers to and from the San Francisco and Oakland airports from various locales around the bay, including the San Francisco waterfront and the Berkeley Marina. After ceasing operations in the 1970s it briefly resumed service in 1983 before going out of business in 1986.

Rebirth of ferries (1959–present)

With the abandonment of the last railroad ferries, there was a brief period 1958-1962 with no commuter ferry service at all on the Bay (though tourist-oriented service to Angel Island began in 1959). In March 1962 Red & White Fleet, then known as Harbor Carriers, started commute-hour ferry service from Tiburon to the San Francisco Ferry Building. During a strike by Harbor Carriers employees in 1969, the Golden Gate Bridge, Highway and Transportation District chartered a boat to provide replacement service; the success of this experiment led the District to establish Golden Gate Ferry and begin operating service from Sausalito to the Ferry Building in 1970. Today Golden Gate Ferry operates operates modern high speed ferryboats between San Francisco and four different landings in Marin County.

In 1973 Alcatraz Island opened to the public as a museum and ferry service from San Francisco began under a concession granted by the National Park Service.

The 1989 Loma Prieta earthquake caused a section of the Bay Bridge road deck to collapse, closing it to all traffic. In response, ferry service was quickly set up between piers in Oakland and Alameda and San Francisco (following almost the same path as the 19th-century "creek route" ferries). This service continued to operate with sponsorship from the City of Alameda and Port of Oakland after the bridge reopened the following month.

In 2011 the San Francisco Bay Area Water Emergency Transportation Authority (WETA) was set up to take over the Oakland/Alameda route and other routes between San Francisco and the East Bay, forming the San Francisco Bay Ferry system; over the following decade it added several additional routes. WETA contracts with the private Blue & Gold Fleet for the operation of these services. Blue & Gold additionally operates its own tourist-oriented ferry and sightseeing services; together these make the company the largest ferry transportation provider in the Bay Area .

Current ferry routes

Annual ridership

Ferryboat roster

Present

Golden Gate (7 vessels)
 Golden Gate (II)
 Del Norte
 Marin
 Mendocino
 Napa
 San Francisco
 Sonoma
WETA (16 vessels)
 Argo
 Bay Breeze
 Carina
 Cetus
 Dorado
 Gemini
 Hydrus
 Intintoli
 Lyra
 Mare Island
 Peralta
 Pisces
 Pyxis
 Scorpio
 Taurus
 Vela
Angel Island–Tiburon
 Angel Island
 Bonita
 Tamalpais
Blue & Gold (20+ vessels)
 Golden Bear
 Oski
 Royal Star
 Zelinsky
Red & White (5 vessels)
 Enhydra
 Harbor Princess
 Harbor Queen
 Royal Prince
 Zalophus
NWP
 Ukiah

Past

Historical ferryboat table

Relocated ferryboats
Several ferries that had seen service on San Francisco Bay were relocated after the bay bridges were built.  Yosemite was sold to the Argentina-Uruguayan Navigation Touring Company, renamed Argentina, and served a route crossing the Rio de la Plata.  Seventeen were purchased by the Puget Sound Navigation Company:
 City of Sacramento
 Fresno (renamed Willapa)
 Golden Age (renamed Klahanie)
 Golden Bear
 Golden Dawn
 Golden Poppy (renamed Chetzemoka)
 Golden Shore (renamed Elwha)
 Golden State (renamed Kehloken)
 Golden West
 Lake Tahoe (renamed Illahee)
 Mendocino (renamed Nisqually)
 Napa Valley (renamed Malahat)
 Peralta (renamed Kalakala)
 Redwood Empire (renamed Quinault)
 San Mateo
 Santa Rosa (renamed Enetai)
 Shasta
 Stockton (renamed Klickitat)

Golden West was promptly resold to San Diego and renamed North Island for service between San Diego and Coronado.  Golden Bear was salvaged for parts after being damaged when a towline parted off the Oregon coast on 15 November 1937.  The others went on to serve in the waters of northwestern Washington and southwestern British Columbia.  After serving seven years as Elwha, Golden Shore was sold to San Diego in 1944 and renamed Silver Strand on the San Diego-Coronado route.  The City of Sacramento operated on the Seattle-Bremerton route in the 1940s, then on the Horseshoe Bay-Nanaimo route from 1952 to 1963 as the MV Kahloke, and finally on the Horseshoe Bay-Langdale route from 1964 to 1976 as the MV Langdale Queen.  The Peralta, rebuilt as the MV Kalakala, operated on various Puget Sound crossings and on the Seattle-Victoria-Port Angeles route.  The City of Long Beach, renamed the City of Angeles, operated out of Port Angeles and the Stockton, which became the Klickitat, operated on the Keystone-Port Townsend route until 2007.  Mendocino (renamed Quinault) and Redwood Empire (renamed Nisqually) were retired in 2003 and scrapped in 2009.  Santa Rosa was renamed Enetai, returned to San Francisco Bay in 1968, and is preserved at Pier 3.

Notes

References

Works cited
 
 
 San Francisco Bay: A Pictorial Maritime History, by John Haskell Kemble, Bonanza Books (1957, 1978).
 San Francisco Bay Ferryboats, by George H. Harlan, Howell-North Books (1967).

External links

 Golden Gate Transit
 Alameda/Oakland/San Francisco Ferry official website
 Baylink (official Vallejo ferry website)
 San Francisco Bay Ferryboats
 
 Cable Car Guy - list of preserved historical ferries of San Francisco Bay
 A guide to the Southern Pacific Company records, 1908-1935
 The Northwesterner, Ferryboat Issue, Spring-Summer 1995, published by The Northwestern Pacific Railroad Historical Society, Santa Rosa CA

Ferries of California
San Francisco Bay
Public transportation in the San Francisco Bay Area